Pulheim (Ripuarian: Pullem) is a town in the Rhein-Erft-Kreis, North Rhine-Westphalia, Germany.

Since the 1920s, a large substation of the Rheinisch-Westfälisches Elektrizitätswerk AG (RWE) is located at Pulheim. It is the end of the north south powerline and a large control center for the power grid of the RWE.

In the communal reform of 1975, several previously independent municipalities were added to the municipality Pulheim, which received city rights in 1981. Pulheim consists of 12 quarters (Stadtteile), including Brauweiler, Geyen and Stommeln.

Education
The following schools are in Pulheim:
Dietrich-Bonhoeffer Primary School, Pulheim
Catholic Primary School Barbara School, Pulheim
Community Primary School “Am Buschweg”, formerly known as “Am Wäldchen”, Pulheim
Richeza Community Primary School, Pulheim-Brauweiler
Wolfhelm School (primary school), Pulheim-Dansweiler
Community Primary School Sinnersdorf, Pulheim-Sinnersdorf
Community Primary School Sinthern-Geyen, Pulheim-Sinthern
Christina School (primary school), Pulheim-Stommeln
Catholic Primary School “An der Kopfbuche”, Pulheim-Stommeln
School at the Jahnstrasse, Pulheim
Community high school (Hauptschule), Pulheim
Marion-Dönhoff-Realschule (high school), Pulheim
Arthur-Koepchen-Realschule (high school), Pulheim-Brauweiler
Scholl-Siblings-Gymnasium (high school), Pulheim
 Abbey-Gymnasium (high school), Pulheim-Brauweiler
Papst-Johannes XXIII-Schule ("Pope John XXIII School") (high school), Pulheim-Stommeln
School for Handicapped Donatus-School (primary and high school), Pulheim-Brauweiler

Economy
RWE
RWE Power AG

Sport
Pulheimer SC
Linde German Masters, golf
FFC Brauweiler
SC Germania Geyen, football club
TUS Schwarz Weiss Brauweiler
Pulheim Gophers Baseballteam
The Raging Abbots Baseballteam
Reha-Sport-Verein

Twin towns – sister cities

Pulheim is twinned with:
 Fareham, England, United Kingdom
 Guidel, France

References

External links

Official website
Pulheim news
Website Stommeln
Website Geyen
Website Brauweiler
Website Dansweiler
History Club of Pulheim
Tourist board for the Rhein-Erft area

Rhein-Erft-Kreis